Vladimir Leonidovich Popov (born 3 September 1946) is a Russian mathematician working in the invariant theory and the theory of transformation groups.

Education and career
In 1969 he graduated from the Faculty of Mechanics and Mathematics of Moscow State University. In 1972 he received his Candidate of Sciences degree (PhD) with thesis Стабильность действия алгебраических групп и арифметика квазиоднородных многообразий (Stability of the action of algebraic groups and the arithmetic of quasi-homogeneous varieties). In 1984 he received his Russian Doctor of Sciences degree (habilitation) with thesis Группы, образующие, сизигии и орбиты в теории инвариантов (Groups, generators, syzygies and orbits in the theory of invariants).

He is a member of the  Steklov Institute of Mathematics and a professor of the National Research University – Higher School of Economics. In 1986, he was an invited speaker at the International Congress of Mathematicians (Berkeley, USA), and in 2008–2010 he was a core member of the panel for Section 2, "Algebra" of the Program Committee for the 2010 International Congress of Mathematicians (Hyderabad, India).

In 1987 he published a proof of a conjecture of Claudio Procesi and Hanspeter Kraft. In 2006, with Nicole Lemire and Zinovy Reichstein, Popov published a solution to a problem posed by Domingo Luna in 1973.

Awards 
In 2012, he was elected a member of the inaugural class of Fellows of the American Mathematical Society which recognizes mathematicians who have made significant contributions to the field.

In 2016, he was elected a corresponding member of the Russian Academy of Sciences.

Books

References

External links 
 Personal profile: Vladimir Leonidovich Popov Steklov Institute of Mathematics

Living people
Russian mathematicians
Fellows of the American Mathematical Society
Academic staff of the Higher School of Economics
1946 births